Rob van Boekel (born 22 February 1987) is a Dutch footballer who plays as an attacking midfielder who for UNA in the Derde Divisie.

Club career
Van Boekel started playing football for local amateur side UNA and joined the PSV academy in 1997. After failing to break into their senior squad, he moved to local rivals FC Eindhoven in 2008.

He returned to UNA in 2013.

References

External links
 Voetbal International

1987 births
Living people
People from Veldhoven
Association football midfielders
Dutch footballers
VV UNA players
PSV Eindhoven players
FC Eindhoven players
Eerste Divisie players
Derde Divisie players
Tweede Divisie players